Stanley Tuemler Escudero (born March 10, 1942) is an American retired diplomat who served the United States Foreign Service in multiple capacities. He served as the ambassador to Azerbaijan, Uzbekistan and Tajikistan throughout the 1990s.

Early life and education
Escudero was born in Daytona Beach, Florida on March 10, 1942. He received his Bachelor of Arts degree from the University of Florida in 1965.

Career
Escudero first came to prominence for his outspoken views on Iran in the 1970s. While serving in the U.S. Embassy in Tehran in the mid 1970s, he questioned the Shah's longevity in power. This challenge to the basic tenets of U.S. policy in the region would probably have ended his career, had the shah not proved him right soon thereafter. As the Iranian revolution was unfolding, Escudero was sent back to Iran with the mission of getting out in the street and finding out what was happening.

Ambassador to Tajikistan
Escudero served as the US ambassador to Tajikistan from 1992 to 1995. Hearings on his nomination were held before the Senate Foreign Relations Committee on August 5, 1992. The committee favorably reported his nomination to the Senate floor on August 6, 1992. Escudero was confirmed by the Senate via unanimous consent on August 7, 1992.

Ambassador to Uzbekistan
Escudero served as the US ambassador to Uzbekistan from 1995 to 1997. Hearings on his nomination were held before the Senate Foreign Relations Committee on August 1, 1995. The committee favorably reported his nomination to the Senate floor on August 10, 1995. Escudero was confirmed by the Senate via voice vote on August 11, 1995.

Ambassador to Azerbaijan
Escudero served as the US ambassador to Azerbaijan from 1997 to 2000. Hearings on his nomination were held before the Senate Foreign Relations Committee on October 29, 1997. The committee favorably reported his nomination to the Senate floor on November 4, 1997. Escudero was confirmed by the Senate via voice vote on November 6, 1997.

References

Sources
Tajikistan relations at U.S. State Dept.
Escudero's Bio
The Political Graveyard: Index to Politicians: Esaias to Esters

1942 births
Living people
20th-century American diplomats
Ambassadors of the United States to Azerbaijan
Ambassadors of the United States to Tajikistan
Ambassadors of the United States to Uzbekistan
University of Florida alumni
People from Daytona Beach, Florida
Hispanic and Latino American diplomats
United States Foreign Service personnel